Hypena vetustalis, the tropical bomolocha moth, is a species of moth in the family Erebidae. It is found in North America.

The MONA or Hodges number for Hypena vetustalis is 8454.1.

References

Further reading

 
 
 

vetustalis
Articles created by Qbugbot
Moths described in 1854